Sergio Fabián Sánchez (born 17 August 2001) is an Argentine professional footballer who plays as a left-back for Alvarado.

Career
Sánchez began his youth career with Banfield at the age of six, before having stints with the academies of River Plate and Boca Juniors. A move to Aldosivi then followed, before his arrival at Racing Club in 2016. Sánchez made the breakthrough into their first-team in October 2020, featuring as an unused substitute for a Copa Libertadores group stage win over Venezuela's Estudiantes de Mérida. He did likewise in early November for three Copa de la Liga Profesional matches, which preceded his senior debut in that competition against Atlético Tucumán on 19 November; he played every minute of a 2–0 away loss. In February 2022, Sánchez joined Alvarado on a one-year loan deal.

Style of play
After starting out as a midfielder, Sánchez transitioned into a left-back whilst with the Racing Club reserves.

Career statistics
.

Notes

References

External links

2001 births
Living people
Sportspeople from Mar del Plata
Argentine footballers
Association football defenders
Racing Club de Avellaneda footballers
Club Atlético Alvarado players
Argentine Primera División players
Primera Nacional players